The 2010–11 NBL season is the 22nd season for the Sydney Kings in the NBL. This is the first season back for the club after a two-year stint away from the league.

Off-season 
Entering the league after two seasons away, the team needed to put together a roster essentially from scratch.

Additions

Roster

Depth chart   

* = Developmental Player (may only participate in home games)

Regular season

Standings

Game log 

|- style="background-color:#bbffbb;"
| 1
| 21 August
| University of Hartford
| W 111-60
|  
| 
| 
| Alexandria Basketball Stadium, Sydney
| 1-0
|- style="background-color:#bbffbb;"
| 2
| 28 August
| @ Maitland Mustangs
| W 82-74
|  
| 
| 
| Maitland Basketball Stadium
| 2–0
|- style="background-color:#bbffbb;"
| 3
| 11 September
| Carfino All-Stars
| W 111-77
|  
| 
| 
| Bridgecoast Stadium, Terrigal
| 3-0
|- style="background-color:#bbffbb;"
| 4
| 28 September
| New Zealand
| W 65-63
|  
| 
| 
| Brickpits Sports Stadium, Hornsby
| 4-0

|- style="background-color:#bbffbb;"
| 1
| 15 October
| @ Melbourne
| W 84-68
| Julian Khazzouh (24)
| Julian Khazzouh (17)
| Luke Cooper (7)
| State Netball and Hockey Centre  3,091
| 1-0
|- style="background-color:#ffcccc;"
| 2
| 16 October
| New Zealand
| L 70-83
| Taj McCullough (17)
| Rod Grizzard (8)
| Rod Grizzard (4)
| The Kingdome  8,533
| 1-1
|- style="background-color:#ffcccc;"
| 3
| 30 October
| @ Townsville
| L 79-80
| Taj McCullough (17)
| Julian Khazzouh (14)
| Luke Cooper (5)
| Townsville Entertainment Centre  3,956
| 1-2

|- style="background-color:#ffcccc;"
| 4
| 6 November
| @ Adelaide
| L 75-87 
| Luke Cooper,  Damien Ryan (17)
| Julian Khazzouh (10)
| Julian Khazzouh, Luke Cooper, Damien Ryan, Taj McCullough (2)
| Adelaide Arena  4,620
| 1-3
|- style="background-color:#ffcccc;"
| 5
| 13 November
| Townsville
| L 59-64
| Julian Khazzouh (18)
| Julian Khazzouh (8)
| Joel Wagner, Rod Grizzard, Taj McCullough (2)
| The Kingdome  5,586
| 1-4
|- style="background-color:#ffcccc;"
| 6
| 26 November
| @ Wollongong
| L 72-89
| Julian Khazzouh (20)
| Julian Khazzouh (8)
| Julian Khazzouh (3)
| WIN Entertainment Centre  4,357
| 1-5

|- style="background-color:#ffcccc;"
| 7
| 3 December
| @ Gold Coast
| L 68-85 
| Julian Khazzouh (22)
| Julian Khazzouh (9)
| Luke Martin, Graeme Dann, Patrick Sanders (2)
| Gold Coast Convention Centre  TBA
| 1-6
|- style="background-color:#ffcccc;"
| 8
| 4 December
| New Zealand
| L 80-94
| Patrick Sanders (20)
| Julian Khazzouh (12)
| Julian Khazzouh (5)
| The Kingdome  4,327 
| 1-7
|- style="background-color:#ffcccc;"
| 9
| 12 December
| Wollongong
| L 80-95
| Patrick Sanders (27)
| Julian Khazzouh (9)
| Ben Knight (4)
| The Kingdome  TBA
| 1-8
|- style="background-color:#"
| 10
| 17 December
| @ Adelaide
| 
|  
| 
| 
| Adelaide Arena
| 
|- style="background-color:#"
| 11
| 19 December
| @ Perth
| 
|  
| 
| 
| Challenge Stadium 
| 
|- style="background-color:#"
| 12
| 23 December
| Melbourne
| 
|
|
|
| The Kingdome 
| 
|- style="background-color:#"
| 13
| 29 December
| Perth
| 
|
|
|
| The Kingdome 
|
|- style="background-color:#"
| 14
| 31 December
| @ Cairns
|
|
|
|
| Cairns Convention Centre 
|
|-

Finals

Player statistics

Regular season

Finals

Awards

Player of the Week

Player of the Month

Coach of the Month

See also 
 2010-11 NBL season

References

External links 
 Official Website

Sydney
Sydney Kings seasons